Shahar Piven-Bachtiar (born 21 September 1995) is a Russian footballer who plays as a defender for Maccabi Tel Aviv.

Early life
Piven-Bachtiar was born in Birobidzhan, Russia. He immigrated to with his mother to Israel, as a six year old, and grew up in Rishon LeZion, Israel.

Career
Piven started his senior career with Maccabi Tel Aviv. After that, he played for Beitar Tel Aviv Bat Yam. In 2018, he signed for Ashdod in the Israeli Premier League, where he made sixteen appearances and scored zero goals.

International career
He was called up again for the senior Israel national team on 14 November 2021, during their 2022 FIFA World Cup qualifiers - UEFA.

Honours

Club

Maccabi Tel Aviv
 Israeli Premier League (2): 2018–19, 2019–20
 Toto Cup (2): 2018–19, 2020–21
 Israel Super Cup (2): 2019, 2020

References

External links
 Dawn of a New Day: Piven reveals his fascinating story 
 Shachar Hassan: That's how Shachar Piven became a regular car player in Maccabi Tel Aviv

1995 births
Living people
Israeli footballers
Association football defenders
Maccabi Tel Aviv F.C. players
Beitar Tel Aviv Bat Yam F.C. players
F.C. Ashdod players
Liga Leumit players
Israeli Premier League players
Russian emigrants to Israel
Israeli people of Russian descent
Israeli people of Soviet descent
People from Birobidzhan